Jošt Urbančič (born 12 April 2001) is a Slovenian footballer who plays as a left-back for Norwegian Eliteserien club Viking FK.

Career
Urbančič is a youth product of Olimpija Ljubljana. He made his Slovenian PrvaLiga debut for Domžale on 22 May 2019 against Triglav Kranj. On 29 December 2022, he signed a four-year contract with Norwegian Eliteserien club Viking.

Career statistics

References

External links
 Jošt Urbančič at NZS 

2001 births
Living people
Footballers from Ljubljana
Slovenian footballers
Slovenia youth international footballers
Association football defenders
Slovenian Second League players
Slovenian PrvaLiga players

NK Domžale players
ND Gorica players
Viking FK players
Slovenian expatriate footballers
Expatriate footballers in Norway
Slovenian expatriate sportspeople in Norway